Železarnica Stadium is a multi-purpose stadium in Skopje, North Macedonia. It is currently used mostly for football matches and serves as the home ground for FK Metalurg Skopje of the Macedonian First League and FK Skopje of the Macedonian Second League, but Metalurg Skopje was required to play at both the Petar Miloševski Training Centre and Boris Trajkovski Stadium in the Macedonian First League because the Železarnica does not meet the necessary league requirements for First League matches to be held there. Metalurg Skopje was able to continue playing at the Železarnica to start the 2015/16 season in September 2015. The stadium capacity holds up to 3,000 spectators.

References

External links
 Stadium information

Football venues in North Macedonia
Sport in Skopje
Multi-purpose stadiums in North Macedonia
FK Metalurg Skopje